The Maui County Police Department provides law enforcement for Maui County, Hawaii which includes the islands Molokai and Lanai. The current Police Chief is John Pelletier.

History
The County Act of 1905 established the five districts for Maui County:  Lahaina and Lana'i, Wailuku and Kaho'olawe, Hana, Makawao, and Moloka'i.  A Sheriff was elected for the County and each district elected a deputy sheriff.  On  June 20, 1905, William Saffrey was elected Sheriff of Maui County.  At that time, the Sheriff's annual salary was $1,800.

The Sheriff's position was abolished in 1939 and a Police Commission was established and given the power to appoint a Chief of Police.  In 1939, the Governor appointed the Police Commission, and Maui County Police Department was created.  The first Chief of Police was George Fritchoff Larsen, Jr (son of local stonemason/builder George Larsen and brother of General Stanley Larsen).

In 1940, there were 76 employees, $134,474 in total expenditures, a county population of 55,785 and per capita cost to the citizens of $2.42.

In 1970, the original police badge design was changed from the star circle shape to the eagle design.  The patrol uniforms were changed from the original dark green material to the light blue shirts and dark blue trousers.  There were 154 employees, $1,891,115 in total expenditures, a county population of 46,156 and the per capita cost to the citizens of $40.06.

In 1980, the patrol uniform were changed to the dark blue shirts and trousers.  There were 227 employees, $5,385,927 in total expenditures, a county population of 71,191 and the per capita cost to the citizens of $75.47.

In 1987, the department moved from its old location of 250 High Street in Wailuku, to the current location of 55 Mahalani Street in Wailuku.  The station was named Hale Maka'i.

In 2000, there were 403 employees, $24,227,019 in total expenditures, a county population of 128,094 and the per capita cost to the citizens of $189.  The average age for police officers was 37.02 years and the average number of years of service was 10.61 years.

Accreditation
On August 3, 1996, at the Commission on Accreditation for Law Enforcement Agencies meeting in Des Moines, Iowa, the Maui Police Department was granted accreditation by the commission after having completed a successful on-site assessment in which the department complied with 410 applicable law enforcement standards.

Since 1996, The Maui County Police Department has been nationally accredited.

See also
 State of Hawaii Organization of Police Officers
Honolulu Police Department
 Hawaii Department of Public Safety
 List of law enforcement agencies in Hawaii

External links
Official website

Maui County, Hawaii
County police departments of Hawaii
1939 establishments in Hawaii
Government agencies established in 1939